The Richard Olive House on Court St. in Smithland in Livingston County, Kentucky, also known as Davis House, was built in about 1841.  It was listed on the National Register of Historic Places in 1982.

It is a two-story five-bay brick I-house.  The house "represents a transitional style, containing both Federal and Greek Revival elements. The Flemish bond brickwork evident on the front facade and the jack arches over the bays express the Federal style, while the front entrances and much of the interior trim reflect the Greek Revival."

It is located on the north side of Court Street, across from the 1845 Livingston County Courthouse, which also is NRHP-listed.

References

Houses on the National Register of Historic Places in Kentucky
Greek Revival architecture in Kentucky
Houses completed in 1841
National Register of Historic Places in Livingston County, Kentucky
1841 establishments in Kentucky
Federal architecture in Kentucky
I-houses in Kentucky
Smithland, Kentucky